Mchunu is a surname. Notable people with the surname include:

Sibongile Mchunu, South African politician
Sipho Mchunu (born 1951), South African musician
Thembeka Mchunu (born 1968), South African politician
Willies Mchunu (born 1948), South African politician

Bantu-language surnames